The 2023 season is Kawasaki Frontale's 19th consecutive season in the J1 League. As well as the domestic league, they also participate in the Emperor's Cup, the J.League Cup and the AFC Champions League following their second placed league finish in 2022.

Players

Out on loan

Transfers

Arrivals

Departures

Competitions

Overall record

J1 League

League table

Results summary

Results by round

Matches 
The full league fixtures were released on 20 January 2023.

J.League Cup 

The club will start the competition at the group stage.

Emperor's Cup 
The team will start the competition at the second round.

AFC Champions League 

Frontale qualified to play the 2023–24 AFC Champions League, after finishing the 2022 J1 League as runners-up. The club earned a direct spot into the competition's group stage. The group stage is planned by the AFC to start on 18 September 2023.

Goalscorers 
Updated as of 11 March 2023.

References

External links 
 Official website 

Kawasaki Frontale seasons
Kawasaki Frontale